Nether Cerne is a hamlet and civil parish in the English county of Dorset. Dorset County Council's latest (2013) estimate of the parish population is 20.

Nether Cerne is sited by the small River Cerne which rises near Minterne Magna  to the north and runs in a narrow valley which is aligned roughly north-south. The Cerne Valley is one of several roughly parallel valleys which drain the dip slope of the Dorset Downs.

The settlement of Nether Cerne comprises a church and adjacent late 17th-century house, plus a few cottages. In 1906 Sir Frederick Treves described the house and church as "ancient old cronies, still hobnobbing together". All Saints Church was originally built from rubble and flint in the second half of the 13th century, though it was restored in 1876 and has a 15th-century tower. It is maintained by The Churches Conservation Trust (previously the Redundant Churches Fund).

References

External links

Hamlets in Dorset
Civil parishes in Dorset